Phyllis Currie Nature Reserve is an  nature reserve north-west of Great Leighs in Essex. It is owned and managed by the Essex Wildlife Trust.

This site is named after Mrs Phyllis Currie, who bequeathed it to the trust. It has diverse habitats, with grassland, a lake, woodland and ditches. Birds include kingfishers and grey herons, and 23 species of butterflies and 13 of dragonflies and damselflies have been recorded.

There is access from Dumney Lane.

References

 Essex Wildlife Trust